The non-marine molluscs of Greece are a part of the molluscan fauna of Greece (wildlife of Greece).

A number of species of non-marine molluscs are found in the wild in Greece.

Freshwater gastropods 

Neritidae
 Theodoxus danubialis (Pfeiffer, 1828)
 Theodoxus varius callosus (Deshayes, 1832)

Viviparidae
 Viviparus contectus (Millet, 1913)
 Viviparus hellenicus (Clessin, 1879)

Bythinellidae
 Bythinella alexpeteri Glöer & Hirschfelder, 2020 - endemic to Greece
 Bythinella amira Glöer & Hirschfelder, 2020 - endemic to Greece
 Bythinella charpentieri (Roth, 1855) - endemic to Greece
 Bythinella corrosa Glöer & Hirschfelder, 2020 - endemic to Greece
 Bythinella dimitrosensis Glöer & Reuselaars, 2020 - endemic to Greece
 Bythinella eleousae Glöer & Hirschfelder, 2020 - endemic to Greece
 Bythinella ellinikae Glöer & Hirschfelder, 2020 - endemic to Greece
 Bythinella jozefgregoi Glöer & Reuselaars, 2020 - endemic to Greece
 Bythinella kambosensis Glöer & Hirschfelder, 2020 - endemic to Greece
 Bythinella kastaliae Glöer & Hirschfelder, 2020 - endemic to Greece
 Bythinella kastanolongosensis Glöer & Pešić, 2020 - endemic to Greece
 Bythinella kithiraensis Glöer & Hirschfelder, 2020 - endemic to Greece
 Bythinella klimaensis Glöer & Reuselaars, 2020 - endemic to Greece
 Bythinella konstadinensis Glöer & Reuselaars, 2020 - endemic to Greece
 Bythinella kwanti Glöer & Reuselaars, 2020 - endemic to Greece
 Bythinella kyriaki Glöer & Reuselaars, 2020 - endemic to Greece
 Bythinella liandinaensis Glöer & Reuselaars, 2020 - endemic to Greece
 Bythinella olymbosensis Glöer & Reuselaars, 2020 - endemic to Greece
 Bythinella perivoliensis Glöer & Reuselaars, 2020 - endemic to Greece
 Bythinella pesici Glöer & Reuselaars, 2020 - endemic to Greece
 Bythinella petrosensis Glöer & Reuselaars, 2020 - endemic to Greece
 Bythinella reghaensis Glöer & Reuselaars, 2020 - endemic to Greece
 Bythinella reischuetzi Glöer & Georgiev in Georgiev & Glöer, 2020 - endemic to Greece
 Bythinella reuselaarsi Glöer & Pešić, 2020 - endemic to Greece
 Bythinella taygetensis Glöer & Hirschfelder, 2020 - endemic to Greece
 Bythinella walensae Falniowski, Hofman & Rysiewska, 2016

Hydrobiidae
 Belgrandiella sperchios A. Reischütz & P. L. Reischütz, 2020 - endemic to Greece
 Daphniola dione Radea, Lampri, Bakolitsas & Parmakelis, 2021 - endemic to Greece
 Daphniola eptalophos Radea, 2011 - endemic to Greece
 Daphniola exigua (A. Schmidt, 1856) - endemic to Greece
 Daphniola exigua pangaea (P.L. Reischütz, 1984) - endemic to Greece
 Daphniola hadei (Gittenberger, 1982) - endemic to Greece
 Daphniola longipenia Grego & Falniowski, 2021 - endemic to Greece
 Daphniola luisi Falnowski & Szarowska, 2000 - endemic to Greece
 Daphniola magdalenae Falniowski, 2015 - endemic to Greece
 Dianella thiesseana (Kobelt, 1878)
 Graecoanatolica macedonica Radoman & Stankovic, 1979 - extinct; it was endemic to Lake Dojran in North Macedonia and Greece.
 Grossuana angeltsekovi Glöer & Georgiev, 2009
 Grossuana avandasensis Glöer, Reuselaars & Papavasileiou, 2018 - endemic to Greece
 Grossuana beroni Georgiev & Glöer, 2020 - endemic to Greece
 Grossuana sidironerensis Glöer, Reuselaars & Papavasileiou, 2018 - endemic to Greece
 Grossuana stenaensis Glöer, Reuselaars & Papavasileiou, 2018 - endemic to Greece
 Grossuana thasia Georgiev & Glöer, 2020 - endemic to Greece
 Horatia podvisensis Glöer & Reuselaars, 2020 - endemic to Greece
 Isimerope semele Radea & Parmakelis, 2013 - endemic to Greece
 Islamia bendidis Reischütz, 1988 - endemic to Greece
 Islamia graeca Radoman, 1973 - endemic to Greece
 Islamia hadei (Gittenberger, 1982) - endemic to Greece
 Islamia papavasileioui Glöer & Reuselaars, 2020 - endemic to Greece
 Islamia skalaensis Glöer & Reuselaars, 2020 - endemic to Greece
 Islamia trichoniana Radoman, 1979 - endemic to Greece
 Myrtoessa hyas Radea in Radea, Parmakelis & Giokas, 2016
 Pontobelgrandiella lavrasi Boeters, P. L. Reischütz & A. Reischütz, 2017 - endemic to Greece
 Potamopyrgus antipodarum (J. E. Gray, 1843)
 Pseudamnicola brachia (Westerlund, 1886) - endemic to Greece
 Pseudamnicola chia (E. von Martens, 1889) - endemic to Greece
 Pseudamnicola exilis (Frauenfeld, 1863) - endemic to Greece
 Pseudamnicola ianthe Radea & Parmakelis in Radea, Parmakelis, Velentzas & Triantis, 2016
 Pseudamnicola ilione Radea & Parmakelis in Radea, Parmakelis, Velentzas & Triantis, 2016
 Pseudamnicola kavosensis Glöer & Zettler, 2021 - endemic to Corfu
 Pseudamnicola lesbosensis Glöer & Reuselaars, 2020 - endemic to Greece
 Pseudamnicola limnosensis Glöer, Stefano & Georgiev, 2018 - endemic to Greece
 Pseudamnicola macrostoma (Küster, 1853) - endemic to Greece
 Pseudamnicola magdalenae Falniowski, 2016
 Pseudamnicola mitataensis Glöer & Porfyris, 2020 - endemic to Greece
 Pseudamnicola pieperi Schütt, 1980 - endemic to Greece
 Pseudamnicola samoensis Glöer & Reuselaars, 2020 - endemic to Greece
 Pseudamnicola skalaensis Glöer & Reuselaars, 2020 - endemic to Greece
 Pseudamnicola stasimoensis Glöer & Reuselaars, 2020 - endemic to Greece
 Pseudoislamia stasimoensis Radoman, 1979 - endemic to Greece
 Radomaniola feheri Georgiev, 2013
 Trichonia trichonica (Radoman, 1973) - endemic to Greece

Moitessieriidae
 Iglica hellenica Falniowski & Sarbu, 2015
 Paladilhiopsis saeuerli A. Reischütz & P.L. Reischütz, 2020 - endemic to Greece

Bithyniidae
 Bithynia corfuensis Glöer & Zettler, 2021 - endemic to Corfu
 Pseudobithynia falniowskii Glöer & Pešić, 2006
 Pseudobithynia trichonis Glöer & al., 2007
 Pseudobithynia ambrakis Glöer, Falnoiwski & Pešić, 2010
 Pseudobithynia euboeensis Glöer, Falnoiwski & Pešić, 2010
 Pseudobithynia nigra Glöer & Zettler, 2021 - endemic to Corfu
 Pseudobithynia zogari Glöer, Falnoiwski & Pešić, 2010

Valvatidae
 Valvata cristata O. F. Müller, 1774
 Valvata klemmi Schütt, 1962
 Valvata macrostoma Mörch, 1864
 Valvata piscinalis (O. F. Müller, 1774)

Acroloxidae
 Acroloxus lacustris (Linnaeus, 1758)

Lymnaeidae
 Galba truncatula (O. F. Müller, 1774)
 Radix auricularia (Linnaeus, 1758)
 Stagnicola corvus (Gmelin, 1791)
 Stagnicola fuscus (C. Pfeiffer, 1821)

Physidae
 Physella acuta (Draparnaud, 1805)

Planorbidae
 Ferrissia clessiniana (Jickeli, 1882)
 Gyraulus chinensis (Dunker, 1848)
 Planorbarius corneus grandis (Dunker, 1850)
 Planorbarius scoliostoma (Westerlund, 1898) - endemic to Greece
 Planorbis carinatus (O. F. Müller, 1774)
 Planorbis planorbis (Linnaeus, 1758)
 Segmentina nitida (O. F. Müller, 1774)

 Lemna pereger

Land gastropods 

Truncatellidae
 Truncatella subcylindrica (Linnaeus, 1767)

Pomatiidae
 Pomatias elegans (O. F. Müller, 1774)

Aciculidae
 Acicula corcyrensis (O. Boettger, 1883) - endemic to Greece
 Acicula hausdorfi Boeters, Gittenberger & Subai, 1989 - endemic to Greece
 Acicula multilineata Boeters, Gittenberger & Subai, 1989 - endemic to Greece
 Platyla gracilis (Clessin, 1877)
 Platyla minutissima Boeters, Gittenberger & Subai, 1989 - endemic to Greece
 Platyla peloponnesica Boeters, Gittenberger & Subai, 1989 - endemic to Greece
 Platyla pinteri (Subai, 1976)
 Platyla similis (Reinhardt, 1880)

Azecidae
 Hypnophila zacynthia (Roth, 1855)

Cochlostomatidae
 Cochlostoma achaicum (O. Boettger, 1885) - endemic to Greece
 Cochlostoma cretense (Maltzan, 1887) - endemic to Greece
 Cochlostoma elegans imoschiense (A. J. Wagner, 1906)
 Cochlostoma euboicum (Westerlund, 1885) - endemic to Greece
 Cochlostoma gracile subaiorum Schütt, 1977 - subspecies endemic to Greece
 Cochlostoma hellenicum (Saint-Simon, 1869) - endemic to Greece
 2 subspecies: C. h. hellenicum and C. h. athenarum (Saint-Simon, 1869)
 Cochlostoma kleciaki (Braun, 1887)
 Cochlostoma pageti Klemm, 1962 - endemic to Greece
 Cochlostoma parnonis Schütt, 1981 - endemic to Greece
 Cochlostoma scalarinum (A. Villa & G. B. Villa, 1841)
 Cochlostoma tesselatum (Rossmässler, 1837)
 7 subspecies in Greece: C. t. tesselatum, C. t. densestriatum (P. Hesse, 1882), C. t. excisum (Mousson, 1859), C. t. griseum (Mousson, 1859), C. t. moussoni (O. Boettger, 1883), C. t. nordsiecki Schütt, 1977 and C. t. platanusae Klemm, 1962

Ferussaciidae
 Cecilioides acicula (O. F. Müller, 1774)

Lauriidae
 Lauria cylindracea (Da Costa, 1778)

Orculidae
 Orculella astirakiensis Gittenberger & Hausdorf, 2004 - endemic to Crete
 Orculella creantirudis Gittenberger & Hausdorf, 2004 - endemic to Crete
 Orculella creticostata Gittenberger & Hausdorf, 2004 - endemic to Crete
 Orculella cretilasithi Gittenberger & Hausdorf, 2004 - endemic to Crete
 Orculella cretimaxima Gittenberger & Hausdorf, 2004 - endemic to Crete
 Orculella cretiminuta Gittenberger & Hausdorf, 2004 - endemic to Crete
 Orculella cretioreina Gittenberger & Hausdorf, 2004 - endemic to Crete
 Orculella critica (Pfeiffer, 1856)
 Orculella diensis Gittenberger & Hausdorf, 2004 - endemic to Dia
 Orculella exaggerata (Fuchs & Käufel, 1936) - endemic to Greece
 Orculella fodela Gittenberger & Hausdorf, 2004 - endemic to Crete
 Orculella franciscoi Gittenberger & Hausdorf, 2004 - endemic to Dia
 Orculella ignorata Hausdorf, 1996
 Orculella scalaris Gittenberger & Hausdorf, 2004 - endemic to Dia

Chondrinidae
 Granopupa granum (Draparnaud, 1801)
 Rupestrella rhodia (Roth, 1839)

Enidae
 Ena monticola (Roth, 1856)
 Eubrephulus peloponnesicus (Gittenberger, 1984) - endemic to Greece
 Mastus etuberculatus (Frauenfeld, 1867)

Achatinidae
 Rumina decollata (Linné, 1758)
 Rumina saharica Pallary 1901

Truncatellinidae
 Truncatellina callicratis (Scacchi, 1833)

Vertiginidae
 Vertigo antivertigo (Draparnaud, 1801)

Clausiliidae
 Albinaria amalthea (Westerlund, 1878) - endemic to Crete
 3 subspecies: A. a. amalthea, A. a. bipalatalis (Martens & Boettger, 1878) and A. a. unipalatalis Nordsieck, 2017
 Albinaria ariadne Schilthuizen & Gittenberger, 1991 - endemic to Crete
 Albinaria arthuriana (Boettger, 1878) - endemic to Crete
 2 subspecies: A. a. arthuriana and A. a. xenogena Nordsieck 2017
 Albinaria brevicollis (Pfeiffer, 1850) - endemic to Greece
 6 subspecies: A. b. astropalia (Boettger, 1883),  A. b. brevicollis,  A. b. cristinae Liberto, Colomba & Sparacio, 2019,  A. b. granoi Liberto, Colomba & Sparacio, 2019,  A. b. maltezana Nordsieck, 2015 and  A. b. sica Fuchs & Käufel, 1936
 Albinaria byzantina (Charpentier, 1852) - endemic to Crete
 2 subspecies: A. b. byzantina and  A. b. glabella (Pfeiffer, 1864)
 Albinaria caerulea (Deshayes, 1835)
 Albinaria candida (Pfeiffer, 1850) - endemic to Crete
 3 subspecies: A. c. candida, A. c. homaloraphe (Pfeiffer, 1850) and A. c. monachorum Nordsieck, 2017
 Albinaria christae Wiese, 1989 - endemic to Crete
 Albinaria corrugata (Bruguière, 1792) - endemic to Crete
 6 subspecies: A. c. alada Schultes & Wiese, 1991, A. c. corrugata, A. c. gemina Nordsieck, 2017, A. c. inflata (Olivier, 1801), A. c. purpurea Reitsma, 1988 and A. c. turgida Wagner, 1924
 Albinaria cretensis (Rossmässler, 1836) - endemic to Crete
 Albinaria eburnea (Pfeiffer, 1854) - endemic to Crete
 4 subspecies: A. e. eburnea, A. e. inflaticollis Nordsieck, 2004, A. e. samariae Nordsieck, 2004 and A. e. sprattiana Nordsieck, 2017
 Albinaria fulvula Flach, 1988 - endemic to Crete
 Albinaria hians (Boettger, 1878) - endemic to Greece
 7 subspecies: A. h. achaica (Boettger, 1885), A. h. conemenosi (Boettger, 1883), A. h. cyclothyra (Boettger, 1878), A. h. hians, A. h. macrodera (Boettger, 1885), A. h. perlactea Nordsieck, 1974 and A. h. violascens (Westerlund, 1894)
 Albinaria hippolyti (Boettger, 1878) - endemic to Crete
 5 subspecies: A. h. aphrodite (Boettger, 1883), A. h. asterousea Schilthuizen, Welter-Schultes & Wiese, 1993, A. h. harmonia Schilthuizen, Welter-Schultes & Wiese, 1993, A. h. hippolyti and A. h. holtzi (Sturany, 1904)
 Albinaria idaea (Pfeiffer, 1850) - endemic to Crete and offshore islands
 7 subspecies: A. i. amabilis Engelhard & Slik, 1994, A. i. idaea, A. i. letoana Nordsieck, 2017 - endemic to the Paximadia islands, A. i. lindneri Nordsieck, 1998, A. i. pichcapunlla Schultes & Wiese, 1991 - endemic to the eastern Paximadia island, A. i. rolli Nordsieck, 1977 and A. i. venosa (Boettger, 1883)
 Albinaria jaeckeli Wiese, 1989 - endemic to Crete
 Albinaria janicollis Schultes & Wiese, 1991 - endemic to Gianysada
 Albinaria janisadana Loosjes, 1955 - endemic to the Dionysades islands
 2 subspecies: A. j. janisadana and A. j. paximadiana Loosjes, 1955
 Albinaria leonisorum (Boettger, 1901) - endemic to Crete
 Albinaria li Welter-Schultes, 1999 - endemic to Crete
 Albinaria loosjesi Nordsieck, 1977 - endemic to Crete and some small islets
 2 subspecies: A. l. loosjesi and A. l. sigridae Nordsieck, 2017
 Albinaria maltzani (Boettger, 1883) - endemic to Crete
 2 subspecies: A. m. ecristata Nordsieck, 2017 and A. m. maltzani
 Albinaria manselli (Boettger, 1883) - endemic to Crete
 2 subspecies: A. m. manselli and A. m. xerokampensis Wiese, 1990
 Albinaria moreletiana (Boettger, 1878) - endemic to Crete
 Albinaria parallelifera (Boettger, 1878) - endemic to Crete
 2 subspecies: A. p. clarissima Nordsieck, 1984 and A. p. parallelifera
 Albinaria praeclara (Pfeiffer, 1853) - endemic to Crete
 3 subspecies: A. p. drakakisi (Maltzan, 1884), A. p. praeclara and A. p. rudis (Pfeiffer, 1864)
 Albinaria pondika Welter-Schultes, 2010 - endemic to Pondikonisi Island off the Crete coast
 Albinaria rebeli Wagner, 1924 - endemic to Crete
 Albinaria retusa (Olivier, 1801) - endemic to Dia
 2 subspecies: A. r. marmorata Schultes, 1990 and A. r. retusa
 Albinaria rodakinensis Wiese, 1991 - endemic to Crete
 Albinaria scopulosa (Charpentier, 1852)
 6 subspecies: A. s. cristata Hausdorf, 1987 - endemic to Greece, A. s. epirotes Nordsieck, 1974, A. s. faueri Hausdorf, 1987 - endemic to Greece, A. s. glabricollis (Pfeiffer, 1866) - endemic to Greece, A. s. porrecta Hausdorf, 1987 - endemic to Greece, A. s. scopulosa - endemic to Greece
 Albinaria senilis corcyrensis (Mousson, 1859)
 Albinaria sphakiota (Maltzan, 1887) - endemic to Crete
 Albinaria spratti (Pfeiffer, 1846) - endemic to Crete
 Albinaria sturanyi Wagner, 1924 - endemic to Crete
 Albinaria sublamellosa (Boettger, 1883) - endemic to Crete
 4 subspecies: A. s. heteroptyx (Boettger, 1883), A. s. obliterata (Boettger, 1883), A. s. schultesi Wiese, 1988 and A. s. sublamellosa
 Albinaria tenuicostata (Pfeiffer, 1864) - endemic to Crete
 3 subspecies: A. t. omalica (Westerlund, 1892), A. t. tenuicostata and A. t. theresiae Nordsieck, 2017
 Albinaria terebra (Pfeiffer, 1853) - endemic to Crete
 Albinaria teres (Olivier, 1801) - endemic to Crete
 7 subspecies: A. t. andreae Nordsieck, 2017, A. t. distans (Pfeiffer, 1864), A. t. extensa (Pfeiffer, 1864), A. t. nordsiecki Zilch, 1977, A. t. teres, A. t. toplouensis Schultes & Wiese, 1991 and A. t. vermiculata (Boettger, 1883)
 Albinaria torticollis (Olivier, 1801) - endemic to Dia
 Albinaria troglodytes (Schmidt, 1868) - endemic to Crete
 6 subspecies: A. t. kitteli Nordsieck, 2017, A. t. niproensis Nordsieck, 2004, A. t. strictecostata (Boettger, 1878), A. t. subvirginea (Boettger, 1883), A. t. troglodytes and A. t. vexans (Boettger, 1883)
 Albinaria ulrikae Schilthuizen & Gittenberger, 1990 - endemic to Crete
 Albinaria violacea Schilthuizen & Gittenberger, 1990 - endemic to Crete
 2 subspecies: A. v. dextrogyra Schilthuizen & Gittenberger, 1990 and A. v. violacea
 Albinaria virginea (Pfeiffer, 1846) - endemic to Crete and offshore islands
 5 subspecies: A. v. gavdopoulensis Nordsieck, 2004 - endemic to Gavdopoula, A. v. gavdosensis Nordsieck, 2004 - endemic to Gavdos, A. v. litoralis Nordsieck, 2004, A. v. strigata (Pfeiffer, 1850) and A. v. virginea
 Albinaria wiesei Gittenberger, 1988 - endemic to Crete
 Albinaria xanthostoma (Boettger, 1883) - endemic to Crete
 2 subspecies: A. x. diktynna Nordsieck, 2017 and A. x. xanthostoma
 Carinigera schuetti Brandt, 1962
 Carinigera schuetti limbrunneri Nordsieck, 1990
 Carinigera schuetti serresensis (Nordsieck, 2015)
 Carinigera stussineri (O. Boettger, 1885)
 Carinigera stussineri distantissima Nordsieck, 2021 - endemic to Greece
 Carinigera stussinieri stussineri (O. Boettger, 1885)
 Charpentieria stigmatica sturmii (Pfeiffer, 1848)
 Graecophaedusa sperrlei Rähle, 1982 - endemic to Greece
 Idyla castalia yeruni Gittenberger, 2002
 Inchoatia haussknechti (O. Boettger, 1886) - endemic to Greece
 6 subspecies: I. h. alticola (Nordsieck, 1974), I. h. haussknechti, I. h. hiltrudae (Nordsieck, 1974), I. h. orina (Westerlund, 1894), I. h. refuga (Westerlund, 1894) and I. h. semilaevis (Boettger, 1889)
 Inchoatia inchoata (O. Boettger, 1889) - endemic to Greece
 4 subspecies: I. i. inchoata, I. i. klemmi (Nordsieck, 1972), I. i. paramythica (Nordsieck, 1974) and I. i. regina (Nordsieck, 1972)
 Inchoatia megdova (Nordsieck, 1974) - endemic to Greece
 4 subspecies: I. m. bruggeni E. Gittenberger & Uit de Weerd, 2009, I. m. megdova, I. m. palatalifera (Hausdorf, 1987) and I. m. tavropodensis (Fauer, 1993)
 Macedonica janinensis maasseni Gittenberger, 2002
 Macedonica pindica bellula Gittenberger, 2002
 Macedonica pindica pindica Gittenberger, 2002
 Macedonica pindica Gittenberger, 2002
 Montenegrina dofleini (Wagner, 1928)
 3 subspecies in Greece: M. d. kastoriae Nordsieck, 1972 - endemic to Greece, M. d. prespaensis Nordsieck, 1988 and M. d.  sinosi Páll-Gergely, 2010
 Montenegrina fuchsi pallida Fauer, 1993 - endemic to Greece
 Montenegrina grammica grammica Nordsieck, 1988 - endemic to Greece
 Montenegrina hiltrudae Nordsieck, 1972
 7 subspecies in Greece: M. h. dennisi Gittenberger, 2002 - endemic to Greece, M. h. densicostulata Nordsieck, 1974 - endemic to Greece, M. h. hiltrudae - endemic to Greece, M. h. maasseni Gittenberger, 2002 - endemic to Greece, M. h. protruda Gittenberger, 2002 - endemic to Greece, M. h. robusta Nordsieck, 2009 - endemic to Greece and M. h. sattmanni Nordsieck, 1988
 Montenegrina janinensis (Mousson, 1859)
 Montenegrina laxa lakmosensis Nordsieck, 2009
 Montenegrina rugilabris (Mousson, 1859)
 5 endemic subspecies in Greece: M. r. edmundi Szekeres, 2006, M. r. gregoi Fehér & Szekeres, 2016, M. r. irmengardis Klemm, 1962, M. r. lambdaformis Reischütz & Sattmann, 1990 and M. r. rugilabris
 Montenegrina skipetarica (Soós, 1924)
 4 endemic subspecies in Greece: M. r. konitsae Nordsieck, 1972, M. r. pindica Nordsieck, 1988, M. r. thysi Loosjes & Loosjes-van Bemmel, 1988 and M. r. voidomatis Nordsieck, 1974
 Montenegrina zilchi Nordsieck, 1974
 Papillifera papillaris (O. F. Müller, 1774)
 Sciocochlea collasi Sturany, 1904 - endemic to Corfu
 Sciocochlea cryptica Subai & Szekeres, 1999
 3 subspecies endemic to Greece: S. c. acheron A. Reischütz & P.L. Reischütz, 2004, S. c. cryptica and S. c. filiates A. Reischütz & P.L. Reischütz, 2009
 Sciocochlea nordsiecki Subai, 1993
 Tsoukatosia arabatzis A. Reischütz & P.L. Reischütz, 2014 - endemic to Greece
 Tsoukatosia argolica A. Reischütz, P.L. Reischütz & Szekeres, 2016- endemic to Greece
 Tsoukatosia christinae A. Reischütz & P.L. Reischütz, 2003 - endemic to Greece
 Tsoukatosia evauemgei A. Reischütz, N. Reischütz & P.L. Reischütz- endemic to Greece
 Tsoukatosia lia Gittenberger, 2000 - endemic to Greece
 Tsoukatosia nicoleae A. Reischütz, P.L. Reischütz & Szekeres, 2016 - endemic to Greece
 Tsoukatosia pallgergelyi A. Reischütz, P.L. Reischütz & Szekeres, 2016 - endemic to Greece
 Tsoukatosia subaii Hunyadi & Szekeres, 2009 - endemic to Greece

Spiraxidae
 Poiretia compressa (Mousson, 1859)

Oxychilidae
 Eopolita protensa (Férussac, 1832)
 Libania rhodia Hausdorf & Kalaentzis, 2021 - endemic to Rhodos
 Mediterranea mariensis (E. Gittenberger, 2008) - endemic to Greece
 Oxychilus amaltheae Riedel & Subai, 1982 - endemic to Greece
 Oxychilus hydatinus (Rossmässler, 1838)

Pristilomatidae
 Hawaiia minuscula (Binney, 1841) - introduced
 Gyralina candida paupercula Riedel & Subai, 1993 - subspecies is endemic to Greece
 Gyralina ermonae Gittenberger, 1977 - endemic to Greece
 Gyralina epeirotica Riedel, 1983 - endemic to Greece
 2 subspecies: G. e. epeirotica and G. e. mylonasi Riedel & Subai, 1993
 Gyralina formosa Riedel & Subai, 1993 - endemic to Greece
 Gyralina hausdorfi Riedel, 1990 - extinct, it was endemic to Greece
 Gyralina pageti Gittenberger, 1988 - endemic to Greece
 Gyralina sattmanni Riedel, 1990 - endemic to Greece
 Gyralina tsatsae Gittenberger, 1977 - endemic to Greece
 Gyralina velasensis Riedel & Subai, 1991 - endemic to Greece
 Lindbergia parnonensis E. Gittenberger, 2008 - endemic to Greece
 Vitrea contracta (Westerlund, 1871)
 Vitrea megistislavras A. Reischütz & P.L. Reischütz, 2014 - endemic to Greece
 Vitrea subrimata (Reinhardt, 1871)

Zonitidae
 Balcanodiscus danyii Erőss, Fehér & Páll-Gergely, 2011 - endemic to Greece
 Balcanodiscus stummerorum A. Reischütz, P. L. Reischütz & W. Fischer, 2008 - endemic to Greece
 Zonites anaphiensis Riedel & Mylonas, 1981 - endemic to Greece
 Zonites embolium Fuchs & Käufel, 1936
 Zonites embolium elevatus Riedel & Mylonas, 1997 - extinct, it was endemic to Greece
 Zonites santoriniensis Riedel & Norris, 1987 - extinct, it was endemic to Greece
 Zonites siphnicus Fuchs & Käufel, 1936 - extinct, it was endemic to Greece

Milacidae
 Tandonia aff. cretica

Limacidae
 Limax conemenosi O. Böttger, 1882

Agriolimacidae
 Deroceras astypalaeense Wiktor & Mylonas, 1992 - endemic to Greece
 Deroceras dewinteri Maassen, 2000
 Deroceras halieos de Winter & Butot, 1986 - endemic to Greece
 Deroceras ikaria P.L. Reischütz, 1983 - endemic to Icaria
 Deroceras johannae de Winter & Butot, 1985 - endemic to Andros
 Deroceras kasium Rähle, 1993 - endemic to Kasos
 Deroceras korthionense de Winter & Butot, 1985 - endemic to Andros
 Deroceras nyphoni de Winter & Butot, 1986 - endemic to Skiathos
 Deroceras oertzeni (Simroth, 1889)
 Deroceras pageti Grossu, 1972 - endemic to Greece (D. saronicum Rähle, 1986 is a synonym)
 Deroceras rethimnonense de Winter & Butot, 1986 - endemic to Crete
 Deroceras samium Rähle, 1986 - endemic to Samos

Vitrinidae
 Oligolimax annularis (Studer, 1820)

Hygromiidae
 Metafruticicola noverca (L. Pfeiffer, 1853)
 Metafruticicola pellita (Férussac, 1832)
 Monacha parumcincta (Rossmässler, 1837)
 Monacha rothii (L. Pfeiffer, 1841)

Geomitridae
 Cernuella ionica (Mousson, 1854)
 Trochoidea pyramidata (Draparnaud, 1805)
 Xerocrassa amphiconus (Maltzan, 1883) - endemic to Greece
 Xerocrassa claudia Hausdorf & Welter-Schultes, 1998 - endemic to Greece
 Xerocrassa claudiconus Hausdorf & Welter-Schultes, 1998 - endemic to Greece
 Xerocrassa cretica (Férussac, 1821)
 Xerocrassa diensis (Maltzan, 1883 - endemic to Greece)
 Xerocrassa franciscoi Hausdorf & Sauer, 2009 - endemic to Greece
 Xerocrassa grabusana Hausdorf & Sauer, 2009 - endemic to Greece
 Xerocrassa heraklea Hausdorf & Sauer, 2009 - endemic to Greece
 Xerocrassa kydonia Hausdorf & Sauer, 2009 - endemic to Greece
 Xerocrassa lasithiensis Hausdorf & Sauer, 2009 - endemic to Greece
 Xerocrassa mesostena (Westerlund, 1879) - endemic to Greece
 Xerocrassa poecilodoma (Boettger, 1894) - endemic to Greece
 Xerocrassa rhithymna Hausdorf & Sauer, 2009 - endemic to Greece
 Xerocrassa siderensis (Maltzan, 1883) - endemic to Greece
 Xerocrassa siphnica (Kobelt, 1883) - endemic to Greece
 Xerocrassa subvariegata (Maltzan, 1883) - endemic to Greece

Helicidae
 Cattania faueri (Subai, 1990) - endemic to Greece
 Cattania haberhaueri (Sturany, 1897)
 Cattania ista A. Reischütz, N. Steiner-Reischütz & P. L. Reischütz, 2016 - endemic to Greece
 Cattania trizona (Rossmässler, 1835)
 Codringtonia codringtonii (Gray, 1834) - endemic to Greece
 Codringtonia elisabethae Subai, 2005 - endemic to Greece
 Codringtonia eucineta (Bourguignat, 1857) - endemic to Greece
 Codringtonia gittenbergeri Subai, 2005 - endemic to Greece
 Codringtonia helenae Subai, 2005 - endemic to Greece
 Codringtonia intusplicata (Pfeiffer, 1851) - endemic to Greece
 Codringtonia neocrassa Zilch, 1952
 Codringtonia parnassia (Roth, 1855) - endemic to Greece
 Cornu aspersum (O. F. Müller, 1774)
 Cornu cretensis Hausdorf, Bamberger & Walther, 2020 - endemic to Crete
 Eobania vermiculata (O. F. Müller, 1774)
 Helix asemnis Bourguignat, 1860
 Helix borealis Mousson, 1859
 Helix cincta O. F. Müller, 1758
 Helix fathallae Nägele, 1901
 Helix figulina Rossmässler, 1839
 Helix godetiana Kobelt, 1878 - endemic to Greece
 Helix lucorum Linnaeus, 1758
 Helix nucula Mousson, 1854
 Helix pelagonesica (Rolle, 1898) - endemic to Greece
 Helix philibinensis Rossmässler, 1839
 Helix pronuba Westerlund & Blanc, 1879
 Helix schlaeflii Mousson, 1859
 Helix thessalica Boettger, 1886
 Helix valentini Kobelt, 1891
 Josephinella argentellei (Kobelt, 1872) - endemic to Greece
 Josephinella brenskei (O. Boettger, 1883) - endemic to Greece
 Josephinella broemmei (Kobelt, 1892) - endemic to Greece
 Josephinella byshekensis (Knipper, 1941)
 Josephinella choristochila (O. Boettger, 1886) - endemic to Greece
 Josephinella comephora (Bourguignat, 1858) - endemic to Greece
 Josephinella conemenosi (O. Boettger, 1885) - endemic to Greece
 Josephinella eliaca (Kobelt, 1893) - endemic to Greece
 Josephinella hemonica (Thiesse, 1884) - endemic to Greece
 Josephinella kaeufeli (Knipper, 1939) - endemic to Greece
 Josephinella krueperi (O. Boettger, 1891) - endemic to Greece
 Josephinella phocaea (J. R. Roth, 1855) - endemic to Greece
 Josephinella sattmanni (Subai, 1995) - endemic to Greece
 Josephinella subzonata (Mousson, 1859)
 Josephinella vikosensis (Subai, 1990) - endemic to Greece
 Levantina rechingeri Fuchs & Käufel, 1936 - endemic to Karpathos
 Maltzanella godetiana (Kobelt, 1878) - endemic to Greece
 Thiessea amorgia (Westerlund, 1889) - endemic to Greece
 Thiessea arcadica (L. Pfeiffer, 1853) - endemic to Greece
 Thiessea bacchica (E. von Martens, 1889) - endemic to Greece
 Thiessea cyclolabris (Deshayes, 1840) - endemic to Greece
 Thiessea euboeae (Frauenfeld, 1867) - endemic to Greece
 Thiessea fuchsiana (Knipper, 1939) - endemic to Greece
 Thiessea heldreichi (L. Pfeiffer, 1846) - endemic to Greece
 Thiessea hymetti (Mousson, 1854) - endemic to Greece
 Thiessea melpomene (Subai, 1996) - endemic to Greece
 Thiessea nympha (Subai, 1996) - endemic to Greece
 Thiessea pieperi (Subai, 1996) - endemic to Greece
 Thiessea polyhymnia (Subai, 1996) - endemic to Greece
 Thiessea posthuma (Knipper, 1939) - endemic to Greece
 Thiessea sphaeriostoma (Bourguignat, 1857) - endemic to Greece
 Thiessea valkanovi (Urbański, 1960) - endemic to Greece

Helicodontidae
 Lindholmiola barbata (Férussac, 1821) - endemic to Greece
 Lindholmiola corcyrensis (Rossmässler, 1838)
 Lindholmiola lens (Férussac, 1832)
 Lindholmiola regisborisi (A.J. Wagner, 1928)
 Lindholmiola reischuetzi Falkner, 1995 - endemic to Greece
 Lindholmiola spectabilis Urbanski, 1960 - endemic to Greece

Sphincterochilidae
 Sphincterochila insularis (Boettger, 1894)

Bivalvia

Unionidae
 Unio crassus ionicus (Drouet, 1879)
 Unio mancus Lamarck, 1819
 Unio pictorum (Linnaeus, 1758)
 Anodonta cygnea (Linnaeus, 1758)
 Potomida acarnanica (Kobelt, 1879)

Dreissenidae
 Dreissena blanci Westerlund, 1890
 Dreissena polymorpha (Pallas, 1771)

Sphaeriidae
 Odhneripisidium annandalei (Prashad, 1925)

See also
 List of marine molluscs of Greece

Lists of molluscs of surrounding countries:
 List of non-marine molluscs of Albania
 List of non-marine molluscs of Bulgaria
 List of non-marine molluscs of North Macedonia
 List of non-marine molluscs of Turkey

References

External links
 Towards a catalogue and bibliography of the freshwater Mollusca of Greece

Greece
Molluscs
Greece
Greece